George Peter William Bacon (born 16 September 1992 in Nottingham) is an English List A cricketer active 2013 who played for Nottinghamshire.

References

External links

1992 births
English cricketers
Nottinghamshire cricketers
Bedfordshire cricketers
Living people
21st-century English people
Cricketers from Nottingham